is a Japanese footballer who plays for Júbilo Iwata.

Club statistics
Updated to 8 August 2022.

References

External links
Profile at Júbilo Iwata
Profile at Nagano Parceiro

1992 births
Living people
Meiji University alumni
Association football people from Tokyo
Japanese footballers
J1 League players
J2 League players
J3 League players
Kashiwa Reysol players
AC Nagano Parceiro players
Júbilo Iwata players
Association football goalkeepers